Sir John Dean Paul, 1st Baronet (December 1775 – 16 January 1852), of Rodborough, was an English landowner, banker, painter, and occasional author.

Most of Paul’s works as a painter were landscapes and paintings of horses. In 1821 he was created a baronet, a revival of an honour previously held by another branch of the Paul family.

Paul was the father of Sir John Dean Paul, 2nd Baronet (1802–1868), banker and fraudster. 

He died in 1852 and was buried in Kensal Green Cemetery, where his mausoleum was designed by John Griffith, the architect of the main cemetery buildings.

Publications
Journal of a party of pleasure to Paris in the month of August, 1802: by which any person intending to take such a journey may form an accurate idea of the expence that would attend it, and the amusement he would probably receive: together with thirteen views from nature, illustrative of French scenery (London: T. Cadell, Jun. & W. Davies, 1802)
Journal d'un voyage à Paris au mois d'août 1802 (Paris, A. Picard et fils, 1913)
The Man of Ton: a satire (London: Henry Colburn, 1828)
ABC of Fox Hunting, with 26 coloured illustrations (London: J. Mitchell Royal Library, c. 1870)

Notes

External links
Sir John Dean Paul Online books, University of Pennsylvania

1775 births
1852 deaths
18th-century English painters
19th-century English painters
18th-century English male artists
19th-century English male artists
Baronets in the Baronetage of the United Kingdom
English landscape artists